Stanisław Wawrzecki (1922 – March 19, 1965) was a Director of State-Directed Meat Trade in Praga (part of Warsaw), and the last person sentenced to death and executed in Poland for economy-related crimes after 1956.

He was convicted for corruption. He admitted to receiving over three and half of million Złoty. This crime risked a maximum of 5 years in prison, but the court - under conditional clause - sentenced him to death without the right to appeal. Council of State refused his request for commutation and, finally, he was hanged. He remains the last person executed in Poland for a non-military crime other than murder, and will remain so given Poland's abolition of the death penalty. His trial was influenced by strong pressure from the communist authorities, especially from then PUWP First Secretary, Władysław Gomułka. In 2002 the Polish Supreme Court turned down the death sentence post factum, arguing that this was a clear miscarriage of justice. Nevertheless, the Court did not rehabilitate him because it was the nature of the sentence which was disputed, rather than his guilt.

Wawrzecki's son, Paweł Wawrzecki, is a well-known Polish actor.

References

See also
 Capital punishment in Poland

1922 births
1965 deaths
People executed by Poland by hanging
Executed Polish people
People executed by the Polish People's Republic
People executed for corruption